Cooku with Comali (Season 4) is the fourth season of the Tamil reality cooking TV show Cooku with Comali, that launched on 28 January 2023. on Star Vijay. Over four years, Cooku with Comali has rolled out three seasons and Rakshan has officially once again been appointed as the host for the fourth time. Chef Damodharan and Chef Venkatesh Bhat as the Judges.

Contestants (Cooks)

Comalis 
 Pugazh
 Sunitha Gogoi
 GP Muthu
 Raveena Daha
 Mohammed Kuraishi
 Tiger Thangadurai
 Singapore Deepan
 Monisha Blessy
 Silimisam Siva
 Otteri Siva (Week 1 and 8)
 Manimegalai (From Week 2 to Week 5)

Pairings

Release
The first promo was released on 6 January 2023 with the slogan “Cook with Comali Sirika Readya Pangali”. First episode was telecasted on Jan 28 sat 9.30 pm

References

External links
 Cooku With Comali on IMDb

Star Vijay original programming
2023 Tamil-language television seasons
Tamil-language television shows
Tamil-language game shows
Tamil-language reality television series
Tamil-language cooking television series
Television shows set in Tamil Nadu